The 2017 BYU Cougars softball team represents Brigham Young University in the 2017 NCAA Division I softball season.  Gordon Eakin entered the year as head coach of the Cougars for a 15th consecutive season. 2017 is the fourth season for the Cougars as members of the WCC in softball. The Cougars enter 2017 having won their last 8 conference championships and as the favorites in the WCC.

2017 Roster

Schedule 

|-
!colspan=10 style="background:#002654; color:#FFFFFF;"| Puerto Vallarta College Challenge

 
|-
!colspan=10 style="background:#002654; color:#FFFFFF;"| DeMari Desert Classic

|-
!colspan=10 style="background:#002654; color:#FFFFFF;"| Mary Nutter Collegiate Classic

|-
!colspan=10 style="background:#002654; color:#FFFFFF;"| San Diego Classic 1

|-
!colspan=10 style="background:#002654; color:#FFFFFF;"| Fresno State Invitational

|-
!colspan=10 style="background:#002654; color:#FFFFFF;"| Regular Season

|-
!colspan=10 style="background:#002654; color:#FFFFFF;"| Deseret First Duel

|-
!colspan=10 style="background:#002654; color:#FFFFFF;"| UCLA Invitational

|-
!colspan=10 style="background:#002654; color:#FFFFFF;"| Regular Season

|-
!colspan=10 style="background:#002654; color:#FFFFFF;"| UCCU Crosstown Clash

|-
!colspan=10 style="background:#002654; color:#FFFFFF;"| Regular Season

|-
!colspan=10 style="background:#002654; color:#FFFFFF;"| UCCU Crosstown Clash

|-
!colspan=10 style="background:#002654; color:#FFFFFF;"| Regular Season

|-
!colspan=10 style="background:#002654; color:#FFFFFF;"| 2017 NCAA Division I softball tournament

TV, Radio, and Streaming Information
Feb. 9: 
Feb. 9: 
Feb. 23: 
Feb. 23:
Feb. 24:
Feb. 24:
Feb. 25:
Mar. 2: 
Mar. 15: Spencer Linton & Gary Sheide
Mar. 15: Spencer Linton & Gary Sheide
Mar. 16: 
Mar. 16: 
Mar. 22: Spencer Linton & Gary Sheide
Mar. 25:
Mar. 25: 
Mar. 30:
Apr. 5: 
Apr. 11: 
Apr. 14: Spencer Linton & Gary Sheide
Apr. 14: Spencer Linton & Gary Sheide
Apr. 15: Spencer Linton & Gary Sheide
Apr. 19: Spencer Linton & Gary Sheide
Apr. 26: Spencer Linton & Gary Sheide
Apr. 28: 
Apr. 28: 
Apr. 29: Spencer Linton & Gary Sheide
May 3: 
May 8: 
May 9: 
May 18:

External links 
 BYU Softball at byucougars.com

References 

2017 team
2017 in sports in Utah
2017 West Coast Conference softball season